Eric Glenn Harroun (11 June 1982 – 8 April 2014) was an American Sunni Muslim convert, and former fighter with the Free Syrian Army in Syria, during the Syrian Civil War. Upon returning to the United States in March 2013, Harroun was detained from March 28, 2013, to September 20, 2013, and charged with various offenses, before being released under a secret plea deal. Harroun died of an accidental drug overdose on 8 April 2014.

Early life and education 
Eric Harroun was born in Colorado Springs, Colorado to Shirley Ann and Darryl Harroun.

According to a Fox News article, while Harroun was a student at Pima Community College in Tucson in the fall of 2010, he began to identify himself as a Muslim, allegedly after becoming close to two Iraqi-American brothers he knew. However, Harroun denied this and said that his conversion to Islam was the result of studying the Middle East in general while he was in the 6th grade.

Career 
Harroun joined the United States Army for three years, serving in the U.S. Army's 568
th Engineering Company from 2000 to 2003, where he attained the rank of private first class, but was never deployed overseas. He was discharged after a jeep crash at his base in Fort Riley, Kansas, which left him with a serious head injury, resulting in a metal plate being inserted into his head by doctors. According to his father Darryl, this caused his son to have exacerbated depression, mood swings, and other side effects. "He was already suffering from depression before that, and the accident just kind of multiplied it."

He visited Lebanon in May 2010, Prague in August 2010, and Egypt and Lebanon again during December 2010. In 2011, while still in Egypt, he took part in the pro-democracy demonstrations in Tahrir Square (allegedly being arrested and held at gunpoint by Hosni Mubarak's security forces), and finally visited Turkey in November 2012.

Activities in Syria 
On January 7, 2013, Harroun crossed into Syria and made his way to the town of Azaz. He alleged he joined the 'Amr ibn al-'As brigade, a faction of the Free Syrian Army. On January 10, 2013, he was then sent on an attack on a Syrian army camp with a group of fellow fighters. In the confusion of the fighting he was separated from his group, most of whom he believes were killed. In the retreat, he jumped on the back of an Al-Nusra truck (unaware of which faction it belonged to) and was taken back to their base. Harroun later stated:
 "I was separated from my unit in the fighting. I found these guys. I didn't even know they were al-Nusra until later. I said, 'I need a ride back to my commander.' It took 25 days to get them to give me a ride."

He alleges the Nusra front fighters initially treated him as a captive, although he later gained their trust and joined them in attacking Syrian army units, in which he may have killed as many as ten soldiers. However, he denied willingly fighting for the  Al-Nusra Front (an offshoot of Al-Qaeda in Iraq), claiming it was done out of expediency. He posted many photographs and videos of his actions to social media sites (especially Facebook) showing himself handling various weapons (including RPGs and AK-47 assault rifles) and wearing military gear. In one video posted online, he addresses Syrian president Bashar al-Assad directly, telling him his "days are numbered". In another, he and his group of fighters claim victory for downing a helicopter. Many of these videos were swiftly picked up by the media and those following the conflict.

After eventually getting back to the FSA base on February 6 (after nearly a month of fighting with the al-Nusra front) he discovered that his passport had been destroyed in a mortar attack. After posting photographs to Facebook showing he and several of his FSA comrades on February 6, he left Syria on February 10, his commander requesting that he fetch weapons from Turkey and bring them back. However, he chose to remain in Turkey and to go back to Istanbul.

Aftermath 
A pro-government YouTube channel claimed he had been killed, incorrectly identifying a fighter seen with him in a previous video as Harroun. However, in reply to an email sent to him by the Mail Online, Harroun stated: "Syrian Media must be smoking something because I am alive and well chilling in Istanbul having a martini at the moment." He later claimed that "Getting into al-Nusra is not rocket science, it just takes brains."

He later did an interview around March 2, 2014, with two journalists working with FoxNews. However, the article later published on FOX (on March 11) about him stated he had descended into "Islamic fanaticism" and selectively used quotes from his Facebook page. A follow-up article was published three weeks later. He then visited the US consulate in Istanbul, worried that he would be labelled as a terrorist and in need of a new passport. When he went in, the FBI official had the first FOX news story printed on his desk. Harroun was interrogated for periods of several hours (by both an FBI and CIA official) over the course of two days. He later claimed that he had been set up by FOX News and that he would have to "hire a fucking Jewish lawyer to sue their asses when I get back". He denied he was affiliated with al-Qaeda in any way whatsoever: "I'm not Al-Qaeda. I like my beer and my smoke and I like my women. I'm not about the praying five times a day and all that shit."

Arrest and charges 
He later flew back into the United States on March 27, to Dulles Airport in Virginia, where he voluntarily had another discussion with FBI agents. He was later arrested on March 28 at a hotel. A ten-page criminal complaint was filed against him by the FBI, charging him with using a weapon of mass destruction outside of the United States. This charge carries the penalty of either death or life imprisonment if convicted.

He appeared in court with his public defender in a hearing on April 8 in Alexandria (Virginia) and was denied bail. At the hearing, prosecutor Carter Burwell said it would be illegal for an American to travel to Syria and take up arms against Assad's government with any opposition group. This echoes what he was previously told by the FBI officer at the US consulate - which had led Harroun to previously remark that it was "bullshit" that an American couldn't fight in Syria.

He was indicted by a federal grand jury on the additional charge of conspiring to provide material support to a foreign terrorist group (which carries the maximum penalty of 15 years in prison) on June 20. He appeared in court again on July 8, and was ordered by the judge to remain in detention, pending trial. In court, Harroun's lawyer Geremy Kamens claimed he was confused when he claimed to have joined al-Nusra, wanted to avoid extremists, spoke little Arabic, and actually joined the al Nasser (Victory) brigade (an associate of Jabhat al-Nusra which is not classed as a terrorist organisation). However the prosecution successfully argued that the four confessions Harroun had made to journalists were sufficient evidence due to the fact that they corroborated factual information, stating that the towns Harroun said he had been in were also strongholds of the al-Nusra front. The magistrate also maintained that he saw the confession as legitimate.

Reception and reactions in the media 

He had been compared to former US fighter Aukai Collins, who fought with the Chechen rebels,  John Walker Lindh, who fought with the Taliban, and Matthew VanDyke, who fought with the Free Libyan Army. While some on social media sites set up Facebook pages designed to show support for Harroun and claiming his arrest is/was unjust, in the mainstream media Harroun was routinely referred to as having 'joined al-Qaeda', and some of his quotes were selectively used, as were photographs and videos posted by Harroun onto social media sites. However some writers such as Harold Maass emphasised the fact that Harroun had never been known to voice any anti-American or extremist sentiments (and had actually stated a hatred of al-Qaeda and extremism) and stated a belief that Harroun's error was to end up fighting with the wrong people, in a way which was ironically aligned with US government interests. Robert M. Chesney of The New York Times  also shares the belief that Harroun was "fighting on the U.S. side, but with the wrong people."

James Joyner at Outside the Beltway also supported this narrative. He claimed that the charges were not sufficient to warrant Harroun's imprisonment for life. He described Harroun as being possibly "wacko", but also conceded that "based only on the reporting I've seen — he doesn't appear to be an al Qaeda sympathizer, much less a terrorist" and that "there's no evidence in the news reports that Harroun has engaged in terrorism or any anti-American activities.

Harroun's father Darryl claims that his son was "100 percent American" and alleged that his son was working with the CIA during his time in Syria. He described him as "definitely not Al-Qaeda" and "very patriotic". He also stated that he didn't understand the charges, but believes his son would never ally himself with a group which was against the United States. He was unaware his son was in Syria from January to February. He alleged his son was always adventurous, to the extent that family and friends called him "Arizona Jones". According to the first FOX News article, Harroun's sister Sarah left an encouraging message on his Facebook wall, urging him to "keep fighting", and showing solidarity with both her brother and the Syrian people.

Robert Young Pelton (founder of Dangerous magazine) stated in an article for Foreign Policy Magazine that Harroun was effectively "duped by the FBI into incriminating himself" due to his various postings about his activities on social media sites, and statements made to journalists and federal agents.

Andrew J. Tabler, a specialist on Syria at the Washington Institute for Near East Policy, stated that he had seen Harroun's online postings and also expressed concern at the time that they could cause problems for Harroun later on. He described Harroun as a war tourist and as pretty well-known to those following the Syrian war. "I saw those videos and thought, 'Buddy, you better watch out" he said.

In regard to his arrest and former charges, Harroun's federal public defender Geremy Kamens said Harroun's case is "unique in American law" in that, "Never, to my knowledge, has the U.S. government charged a U.S. citizen for fighting with a group aligned with U.S. interests."

Release 
On September 20, 2013, Harroun, under a plea deal, pleaded guilty to "an obscure law regulating munition exports" and was released from jail. He was sentenced to time served, under this secret plea bargain, in a move which generated surprise in the media. He later agreed to an interview with ABC15 Arizona, in which he defended himself against the charges he had faced and spoke at length about his time in Syria. Following his release from prison, Harroun reportedly suffered from depression and began drinking and using heroin. He was admitted into a hospital in December 2013 after being found in his bathroom with a syringe on the counter and having stopped breathing.

Death
On April 9, 2014, Eric's family posted on his Facebook page announcing his death a day earlier from an accidental overdose. Harroun's autopsy revealed acute levels of heroin and sertraline, an antidepressant, in his body. Methamphetamine, amphetamine, codeine, and trazodone were also detected. The medical examiner ruled his death an accident. Harroun was looking forward to getting off of probation early and was planning to return to Syria once he was able to do so. He is survived by his father, mother, and sister.

References

External links
Vice News: The American Jihadist: Eric Harroun In His Own Words (video)
Vice News: The All-American Life and Death of Eric Harroun By Robert Young Pelton

Further reading

1983 births
2014 deaths
American Sunni Muslims
American Islamists
Converts to Sunni Islam
Pima Community College alumni
People from Phoenix, Arizona
Drug-related deaths in Arizona
Al-Nusra Front members
Members of the Free Syrian Army